The Diseños Casanave SC-2005 is a Peruvian proposed upgrade for the FN FAL. It is chambered in the 5.56×45mm NATO round and is compatible with STANAG Magazines.

Variants
The SC-2009MWS or Modular Weapon System, is a top upgrade with picatinny rail Stanag 2324 system, and magazine-fed, selective fire firearms with a 3-position, equipped with a redesigned telescoping stock. While the SC-2009's maneuverability makes it a candidate for non-infantry troops (vehicle crews, clerks and staff officers), it also makes it ideal for close quarters battle (CQB).

The most recent model presented by this company is the designated SC-2010HPMWS Hi-Power Modular Weapon System, improvement of FAL 50-00 automatic rifle, in 7.62×51mm NATO cartridge, with picatinny rail Stanag 2324 system, telescoping stock, and with special muzzle brake to supports the 7.62 mm powerful cartridge, significantly reducing the recoil in shot.

References

External links
Page

5.56 mm assault rifles
7.62×51mm NATO rifles
Weapons of Peru